The JG Sport was a French automobile manufactured from 1922 until 1923.

A cyclecar built by one M. Janvier, it had a 970 cc Ruby engine and chain drive.

External Links
 David Burgess Wise, The New Illustrated Encyclopedia of Automobiles
 Ajay Kumar Bhasker

Cyclecars
Defunct motor vehicle manufacturers of France